SuperMansion is an American adult animated stop-motion sitcom created by Matthew Senreich and Zeb Wells. The series stars Bryan Cranston, Heidi Gardner, Tucker Gilmore, Keegan-Michael Key, Tom Root, Yvette Nicole Brown, Zeb Wells, and Jillian Bell. The series premiered on Crackle on October 8, 2015. The series was renewed for a third season which was released on May 7, 2018. The series was removed from Crackle after it was fully sold to Chicken Soup for the Soul Entertainment in 2020.

The series is currently available on Freevee as of December 14, 2022.

Plot
The League of Freedom is a superhero group that is led by the aging superhero Titanium Rex. From their base called SuperMansion in the fictional city of Storm City, Titanium Rex and his fellow superheroes Black Saturn, American Ranger, Jewbot/Robobot, Cooch, and Brad struggle to keep the team relevant when occasionally visited by the government accountant Sgt. Agony even if it involves fighting an assortment of supervillains like Dr. Devizo as well as Titanium Rex's daughter Lex Lightning.

In season two, Dr. Devizo and Lex Lightning form the Injustice Club in order to combat the League of Freedom. In addition, the League of Freedom deals with a Subtopian invasion led by Titanium Rex's older brother Titanium Dax.

In season three, the League of Freedom has to share the SuperMansion with the Injustice Club in light of Dr. Devizo helping to stop the Subtopian invasion.

Cast

 Bryan Cranston as Titanium Rex
 Keegan-Michael Key as American Ranger, Sgt. Agony
 Heidi Gardner as Cooch
 Tucker Gilmore as Black Saturn
 Zeb Wells as Jewbot/Robobot
 Jillian Bell as Titanium Lex/Lex Lightning
 Tom Root as Brad
 Chris Pine as Dr. Devizo, Robo-Dino
 Breckin Meyer as Courtney/Ringler
 Yvette Nicole Brown as Zenith/Portia Jones

Episodes

Production
SuperMansion began life as a 12-minute pilot for Adult Swim, under the original name Übermansion where, along with several other pilots (including King Star King and Mr. Pickles, both of which were eventually greenlit), it competed for which pilot would be turned into Adult Swim's next series. The pilot won and aired (along with the pilots to King Star King and Mr. Pickles) on August 25, 2013. For unknown reasons, the series moved to Crackle instead with the name change from Übermansion to SuperMansion.

On April 14, 2015, Sony announced that the stop-motion animated series was being developed by Crackle, which Bryan Cranston would voice and executive produce with his Moon Shot Entertainment. Thirteen episodes were being produced, and also starring Seth Green, Keegan-Michael Key, and Jillian Bell. Matthew Senreich and Zeb Wells wrote and would executive produce the series, while other executive producers would be Green, John Harvatine IV, Eric Towner, and James Degus, while Stoopid Buddy Stoodios would produce. The first trailer was released on July 9, 2015, and the other cast included Senreich, Wells, Heidi Gardner, Tom Root, Tucker Gilmore and some other guest stars.

For the show's second season, Arby's signed a product placement deal with the series as part of a broader deal with Crackle. In addition, Arby's was shown to be next door to the abandoned pizza restaurant which the Injustice Club uses as their hideout.

Broadcast
The series had its television premiere on January 1, 2017, on Adult Swim.

Reception 
On review aggregator website Rotten Tomatoes, the series' first season has a 40% Tomatometer with an average rating of 5.8/10, based on 5 reviews.

Home media
Season 1 was released on DVD on October 11, 2016. Season 2 was only released on DVD on September 12, 2018, in Australia.

References

External links

 

2015 American television series debuts
2019 American television series endings
2010s American adult animated television series
2010s American sitcoms
2010s American superhero comedy television series
American adult animated comedy television series
American adult animated superhero television series
American animated sitcoms
Crackle (streaming service) original programming
American stop-motion adult animated television series
English-language television shows
Parody superheroes
Television series by Sony Pictures Television
Television series by Stoopid Buddy Stoodios